Dolce Vito – Dream Restaurant is a 2009 Channel Four television documentary following Vito Cataffo, an Italian-British restaurateur, as he tries to open a restaurant in Italy serving British cuisine.

The series follows Cataffo as he finds a failing Italian restaurant, rescues and renovates it, and then sets about transforming it into a British restaurant.  It also shows Cataldo meeting various producers of high-end British ingredients, and testing these products on the Italian public. Dolce Vito began to air in August 2009, and continued through to September.

Cataffo died in 2010.

References

External links
Dolce Vito - Dream Restaurant on Channel4.com

2009 British television series debuts
2009 British television series endings
2000s British cooking television series
2000s British documentary television series
Channel 4 documentary series
English-language television shows